Khemdarra is a village in the Khyber Pakhtunkhwa Province of Pakistan. It is located at 34°48'0N 72°15'0E with an altitude of 1047 metres (3438 feet). Neighbouring settlements include Kabbal and Dagai.

References

Villages in Khyber Pakhtunkhwa